Chak-e-Arsala Khan is a village in the Baramulla district of the union territory of Jammu and Kashmir, India.

References

Villages in Baramulla district